James Samuel Freeman (born 28 March 2001) is a Botswana swimmer. He competed in the men's 400 metre freestyle at the 2019 World Aquatics Championships and he did not qualify to compete in the final. He competed for Botswana at the 2020 Summer Olympics in the men's 200m freestyle event and the men's 400m freestyle event. 

Freeman is a native of Palapye, Botswana and competes at the collegiate level for the University of Minnesota.

References

External links
 

2001 births
Living people
Botswana male freestyle swimmers
People from Gaborone
White Botswana people
Swimmers at the 2018 Summer Youth Olympics
Swimmers at the 2020 Summer Olympics
Olympic swimmers of Botswana
Minnesota Golden Gophers men's swimmers
Swimmers at the 2022 Commonwealth Games
Commonwealth Games competitors for Botswana